Culiseta inornata, the winter marsh mosquito, or the Unadorned American Cool Weather Mosquito is a species of mosquito in the family Culicidae.  This species is found in southern California.

References

External links

 

Culicinae
Articles created by Qbugbot
Insects described in 1893